The Cross of the Angels is a pre-romanesque Asturian reliquary donated by Alfonso II of Asturias in the year 808 to the Church of San Salvador in Oviedo, Asturias (Spain). The Cross of the Angels is the symbol of the city of Oviedo.

The cross is the first example of jewelry made in the Kingdom of Asturias that has reached our days. Its current appearance is the result of careful reconstruction carried out after the damages the cross underwent in August 1977 after the robbery of the Camara Santa.
The cross is formed by two pieces of cedar wood with, at the center, a round disc.

History

The donation is usually interpreted as a sign of gratitude of the monarch after being restored to the throne, after the years of his incarceration in the monastery of Abelania.

Veneration of the True Cross in the Kingdom of Asturias

Reliquary

The lateral arms have kept the rings from which hang chains with pearls and precious stones, also known as pendilia, comparable to  votive crosses and crowns of the Visigothic treasure of Guarrazar.

Symbol of the City of Oviedo
The Cross of the Angels became the symbol of the city of Oviedo around the 15th century, although it is said that even earlier, in 1262, it was used as a seal of the city. This is reflected in an engraving in the old city walls where the cross, with the Greek letters alpha and omega hanging of his arms, is used as a sign of consecration. Nowadays, the cross is present in the coat of arms of both the city of Oviedo and the Roman Catholic Archdiocese of Oviedo.

Notes

References
 
 
  
 
 
 https://web.archive.org/web/20090329231625/http://www.arqweb.com/lucusaugusti/sello.asp
 http://el.tesorodeoviedo.es/index.php?title=Cruz_de_los_%C3%81ngeles

See also
Treasure of Guarrazar

External links
The Art of medieval Spain, A.D. 500-1200, an exhibition catalog from The Metropolitan Museum of Art Libraries (fully available online as PDF), which contains material on Cross of the Angels (no. 72)º

9th-century sculptures
Asturian culture
Crux gemmata
Reliquary crosses
Religion in Asturias
Spanish art